Grown Backwards is the seventh studio album by musician David Byrne, released on March 16, 2004.

Reception

.

In 2010, Byrne claimed in his book How Music Works it has sold 127,000 physical albums, 8,000 digital albums and 53,000 digital singles (overall 140,000 units sold of albums). The album peaked at #178 and #88 in the US and UK respectively. The album was released on vinyl for the first time on March 15, 2019.

Track listing
All tracks written by David Byrne, except where noted.

Personnel

Performing musicians
 David Byrne - Lead vocals, guitars, dobro, Rhodes, keyboards, synth programming, drum programming
 Rufus Wainwright, Patrick Dillett - Backing vocals
 Barry Burns - Spacey guitar, Rhodes
 Paul Frazier, Steve Swallow, Una McGlone, Andy Waterworth, John Patitucci - Bass
 Jon Vercesi - Rhodes
 Karen Mantler - Organ
 Stephen Barber - Prepared piano
 Paul Godfrey - Sequencing
 Ross Godfrey, Jon Spurney - Keyboards
 Mark Nuccio - Clarinet
 John Mills - Clarinet, bass clarinet, flute
 Mike Maddox, John Linnell - Accordion
 Johnny Quinn, Steve Williams, Kenny Wollesen - Drums
 David Hilliard - Hi-hat
 Joe Cooper, Steve Williams - Percussion
 Mauro Refosco - Marimba, percussion, samples, kitchen implements
 Tom Burritt - Marimba, tympani
 Greg Lawson, Lisa Aferiat, Fiona Stephen, Katherine Fong, Soo Hyun Kwon, Sandra Park, Sharon Yamada - Violin
 Georgia Boyd, David Creswell, Dawn Hannay - Viola
 Jane Scarpantoni, Donald Gillan, Robert Irvine, Alan Stepansky, Jeremy Turner - Cello
 The Tosca Strings (Ames Asbell, Jamie Desautels, Douglas Harvey, Leigh Mahoney, Sara Nelson ,Tracy Seeger) - violin and cello
 Elaine Barber - Harp
 Earl Gardner, Lew Soloff - Trumpet
 Freddie Mendoza - Trombone, euphonium
 Ray Anderson, Keith O'Quinn, Jon Blondell - Trombone
 Bob Stewart - Tuba
 Bob Routch, Philip Myers - French horn
 Shelly Woodworth - Oboe, English horn
 Alex Foster - Tenor saxophone
 Vincent Herring - Alto saxophone
 Gary Smulyan, John Mills - Baritone saxophone
 Pamelia Kurstin - Theremin
 Alan Ford - Vacuum cleaner

Recording studios
 "Glass, Concrete & Stone" recorded at Loveshack Studio
 "The Man Who Loved Beer", "Dialog Box" and "The Other Side of This Life" recorded at Avatar
 "Au Fond du Temple Saint" and "Empire" recorded at RPM Studio
 "Tiny Apocalypse" recorded at CaVa Sound Workshops
 "She Only Sleeps" recorded at Cheeba Central
 Horns for "Dialog Box", "Pirates" and "Glad" recorded at Congress House Studio
 Drums for "Why", "Pirates" and "Civilisation" recorded at Skyline 
 "Un di Felice, Eterea" recorded at Sound on Sound

References

External links

Press release from Nonesuch on the vinyl re-release

2004 albums
Albums produced by David Byrne
Albums produced by Pat Dillett
David Byrne albums
French-language albums
Italian-language albums
Nonesuch Records albums
Warner Records albums